BrassTacks is a Pakistani weekly defense and strategic political program, hosted by defense and security analyst Zaid Zaman Hamid and telecast by News One (Pakistani TV channel). It airs on Sundays at 8 p.m.

Background
BrassTacks offers a strategic analysis of the current geopolitical and security situation in Pakistan by Zaid Hamid. The program is hosted by Hamid, who is a resident of Rawalpindi, Pakistan. The program is directed and produced by Hassan Durrani.

DVD release
DVDs of the first eight programs have been released in the bookshops of Islamabad and Rawalpindi.  These DVDs cover the US' grand strategic plans in world, the concept of greater Israel and their threat to Pakistan, the US war on terror, Pakistan's debacles in Afghan policy, and religious and sectarian terrorism in Pakistan.

The next in line would be the two special editions of spiritual forces programs. This will be followed by the topic of economic terrorism, which is ongoing and would take a few more programs.

Criticism
Some in Pakistan's liberal and left-wing press have severely criticized Zaid Zaman Hamid. He has been accused of distorting facts relating to Islam, Pakistan and the West and forming a "cult of denial" around himself. Journalists like Fasi Zaka of The News International, Nadeem F. Paracha of Dawn Newspaper and Najam Sethi  of Daily Times have been Hamid's leading critics.

In the aftermath of the November 2008 Mumbai attacks, the program was criticized by the Times of India for stating that the attack was planned by ""Hindu Zionists" and "Western Zionists", including the Mossad.

References

External links
 Official website
 Unofficial website
 "Economic Terrorism Part 1" on Vidpk
 BrassTacks special on Youtube
 BrassTacks - "Economic Terrorism" on Youtube

Television series about conspiracy theories
Pakistani television news shows